Paphiopedilum stonei is a species of orchid, endemic to Borneo (Sarawak).

stonei